Čavić is a surname. Notable people with the surname include:

Dragan Čavić (born 1958), Bosnian politician
Milorad Čavić (born 1984), Serbian former professional swimmer
Miroljub Čavić, Serbian basketball player

See also 

 Čavići

Serbian surnames